is a 1991 darts NES game developed by SETA Corporation and published by Romstar in the US and SETA in Japan.

Gameplay 
The game allowed for up to four players to play three weights of darts as one of ten characters in six different versions of darts.

References

External links
Magic Darts at GameFAQs

1991 video games
Darts video games
Multiplayer and single-player video games
Nintendo Entertainment System games
Nintendo Entertainment System-only games
Romstar games
SETA Corporation games
Video games developed in Japan